The Australasian Association for Logic (AAL) is a philosophical organisation for logicians in Australia and New Zealand founded in 1965. The purpose of the organisation is to promote the study of logic. The association publishes the Australasian Journal of Logic.

External links 

AAL Website

Logic organizations
Philosophical societies in Australia